Boris III (28 August 1943), originally Boris Klemens Robert Maria Pius Ludwig Stanislaus Xaver (Boris Clement Robert Mary Pius Louis Stanislaus Xavier), was the Tsar of the Kingdom of Bulgaria from 1918 until his death in 1943.

The eldest son of Ferdinand I, Boris assumed the throne upon the abdication of his father in the wake of Bulgaria's defeat in World War I. Under the 1919 Treaty of Neuilly, Bulgaria was forced to, amongst other things, cede various territories, pay crippling war reparations, and greatly reduce the size of its military. That same year, Aleksandar Stamboliyski of the agrarian Bulgarian Agrarian National Union became prime minister. After Stamboliyski was overthrown in a coup in 1923, Boris recognized the new government of Aleksandar Tsankov, who harshly suppressed the Bulgarian Communist Party and led the nation through a brief border war with Greece. Tsankov was removed from power in 1926, and a series of prime ministers followed until 1934, when the corporatist Zveno movement staged a coup and outlawed all political parties. Boris opposed the Zveno government and overthrew them in 1935, eventually installing Georgi Kyoseivanov as prime minister. For the remainder of his reign, Boris would rule as a de facto absolute monarch, with his prime ministers largely submitting to his will.

Following the outbreak of World War II, Bulgaria initially remained neutral. In 1940, Bogdan Filov replaced Kyoseivanov as prime minister, becoming the last prime minister to serve under Boris. Later that year, with the support of Nazi Germany, Bulgaria received the region of Southern Dobrudja from Romania as part of the Treaty of Craiova. In January 1941, Boris approved the anti-Semitic Law for Protection of the Nation, which denied citizenship to Bulgarian Jews and placed numerous restrictions upon them. In March, Bulgaria joined the Axis. In exchange, Bulgaria received large portions of Macedonia and Thrace, both of which were key targets of Bulgarian irredentism. Boris refused to participate in the German invasion of the Soviet Union and largely resisted German attempts to deport Bulgarian Jews as part of the Holocaust. In 1942, Zveno, the Agrarian National Union, the Bulgarian Communist Party, and various other far-left groups united to form a resistance movement known as the Fatherland Front, which would later go on to overthrow the government in 1944. In August 1943, shortly after returning from a visit to Germany, Boris died at the age of 49. His six-year-old son, Simeon II, succeeded him as tsar.

Early life

Boris was born on 30 January 1894 in Sofia to Ferdinand I, Prince of Bulgaria, and his wife Princess Marie Louise of Bourbon-Parma.

In February 1896, his father paved the way for the reconciliation of Bulgaria and Russia with the conversion of the infant Prince Boris from Roman Catholicism to Eastern Orthodox Christianity, a move that earned Ferdinand the frustration of his wife, the animosity of his Catholic Austrian relatives (particularly his uncle Franz Joseph I of Austria) and excommunication from the Catholic Church. In order to remedy this difficult situation, Ferdinand christened all his remaining children as Catholics. Nicholas II of Russia stood as godfather to Boris and met the young boy during Ferdinand's official visit to Saint Petersburg in July 1898.

He received his initial education in the so-called Palace Secondary School, which Ferdinand had created in 1908 solely for his sons. Later, Boris graduated from the Military School in Sofia, then took part in the Balkan Wars. During the First World War, he served as liaison officer of the General Staff of the Bulgarian Army on the Macedonian front. In 1916, he was promoted to colonel and attached again as liaison officer to Army Group Mackensen and the Bulgarian Third Army for the operations against Romania. Boris worked hard to smooth the sometimes difficult relations between Field Marshal Mackensen and Lieutenant General Stefan Toshev, the commander of the Third Army. Through his courage and personal example, he earned the respect of the troops and the senior Bulgarian and German commanders, even that of the Generalquartiermeister of the German Army, Erich Ludendorff, who preferred dealing personally with Boris and described him as excellently trained, a thoroughly soldierly person and mature beyond his years. In 1918, Boris was made a major general.

Early reign

In September 1918, Bulgaria was defeated in the Vardar Offensive and forced to sue for peace. Ferdinand subsequently abdicated in favour of Boris, who became Tsar on 3 October 1918.

One year after Boris's accession, Aleksandar Stamboliyski (or Stambolijski) of the Bulgarian Agrarian National Union was elected prime minister. Though popular with the large peasant class, Stambolijski earned the animosity of the middle class and military, which led to his toppling in a military coup on 9 June 1923, and his subsequent assassination. On 14 April 1925, an anarchist group attacked Boris's cavalcade as it passed through the Arabakonak Pass. Two days later, a bomb killed 150 members of the Bulgarian political and military elite in Sofia as they attended the funeral of a murdered general in the St Nedelya Church terror assault. Following a further attempt on Boris's life the same year, military reprisals killed several thousand communists and agrarians, including representatives of the intelligentsia. Finally, in October 1925, there was a short border war with Greece, known as the Petrich incident, which was resolved with the help of the League of Nations. 

In the coup on 19 May 1934, the Zveno military organisation established a dictatorship and abolished political parties in Bulgaria. Tsar Boris was reduced to the status of a puppet tsar as a result of the coup. The following year, he staged a counter-coup and assumed control of the country. The political process was controlled by the Tsar, but a form of parliamentary rule was re-introduced, without the restoration of the political parties.

With the rise of the "King's government" in 1935, Bulgaria entered an era of prosperity and astounding growth, which deservedly qualifies it as the Golden Age of the Third Bulgarian Kingdom. It lasted nearly five years. According to Reuben H. Markham, former Balkan correspondent for the Christian Science Monitor, writing in 1941, "As a ruler, Boris is competent; as a citizen exemplary; as a personality inspiring.... His country is to a large extent indebted to him for the comparatively favorable situation it has held in the Balkans, during the last two decades." Markham added, "King Boris is very accessible.  He constantly comes into contact with persons of every sort.  He drives his car up and down the country with no special guards and often stops to converse with peasants, workers or children.  He gives lifts to the humblest pedestrians.  Rare is the Bulgarian township that does not boast of at least one person who has ridden with the King."  "He is without question one of the best kings in Europe."

Marriage and issue
Boris married Giovanna of Italy, daughter of Victor Emmanuel III of Italy, in a Catholic ceremony – not a Mass – at the Basilica of Saint Francis of Assisi in Assisi, Italy, on 25 October 1930. Benito Mussolini registered the marriage at the town hall immediately after the religious service.

Their marriage produced two children: a daughter, Maria Louisa, on 13 January 1932, and a son and heir to the throne, Simeon, on 16 June 1937.

Second World War

In the early days of the Second World War, Bulgaria was neutral, but powerful groups in the country swayed its politics towards Germany (with which Bulgaria had been allied in the First World War). As a result of peace treaties that ended the First World War (the Treaty of Versailles and the Treaty of Neuilly), Bulgaria, which had fought on the losing side, lost two important territories to neighboring countries: the Southern plain of Dobruja to Romania, and Western Thrace to Greece. The Bulgarians considered these treaties an insult and wanted the lands restored. When Adolf Hitler rose to power, he tried to win Bulgarian Tsar Boris III's allegiance. In the summer of 1940, after a year of war, Hitler hosted diplomatic talks between Bulgaria and Romania in Vienna. On 7 September, an agreement was signed for the return of Southern Dobruja to Bulgaria. The Bulgarian nation rejoiced. In March 1941, Boris allied himself with the Axis powers, thus recovering most of Macedonia and Aegean Thrace, as well as protecting his country from being crushed by the German Wehrmacht like neighboring Yugoslavia and Greece. For recovering these territories, Tsar Boris was called the Unifier (Bulgarian: Цар Обединител). Tsar Boris appeared on the cover of Time on 20 January 1941 wearing a full military uniform.

Despite this alliance, and the German presence in Sofia and along the railway line which passed through the Bulgarian capital to Greece, Boris was not willing to provide full and unconditional cooperation with Germany. He refused to send regular Bulgarian troops to fight the Soviet Union on the Eastern Front alongside Germany and the other Axis belligerents, and also refused to allow unofficial volunteers (such as Spain's Blue Division) to participate, although the German legation in Sofia received 1,500 requests from young Bulgarian men who wanted to fight against Bolshevism.

But there was a price to be paid for the return of Dobrudja. This was the adoption of the anti-Jewish "Law for Protection of the Nation" (Закон за защита на нацията – ЗЗН) on 24 December 1940. This law was in accordance with the Nuremberg Laws in Nazi Germany and the rest of Hitler's occupied Europe. Bulgarian Prime Minister Bogdan Filov and Interior Minister Petur Gabrovski, both Nazi sympathisers, were the architects of this law, which restricted Jewish rights, imposed new taxes, and established a quota for Jews in some professions. Many Bulgarians protested in letters to their government.

The Holocaust

In early 1943, Hitler's emissary, Theodor Dannecker, arrived in Bulgaria. Dannecker was an SS-Hauptsturmführer (captain) and one of Adolf Eichmann's associates who guided the campaign for the deportation of the French Jews to concentration camps. In February 1943, Dannecker met with the Commissar for Jewish Affairs in Bulgaria, Alexander Belev, notorious for his antisemitic and strong nationalist views. They held closed-door meetings and ended with a secret agreement signed on 22 February 1943 for the deportations of 20,000 Jews – 11,343 from Aegean Thrace and Vardar Macedonia, and 8,000 from Bulgaria proper. These were the territories conquered by Germany, but being under Bulgarian occupation and jurisdiction at the time, although this occupation was never recognized internationally. The Jewish people in these territories were the only ones who did not get Bulgarian citizenship in 1941–1942, unlike the rest of the population. The remaining 20,000 Bulgarian Jews were to be deported later.

The initial roundups began on 9 March 1943, during that month, Bulgarian military and police authorities deported 11,343 Jews from the Bulgarian-occupied regions of Vardar Macedonia, Pomoravlje in occupied Yugoslavia and Aegean Thrace to Auschwitz-Birkenau and Treblinka.

Boxcars were lined up in Kyustendil, a town near the western border. But as the news about the imminent deportations leaked out, protests arose throughout Bulgaria. On the morning of 9 March, a delegation from Kyustendil, composed of eminent public figures and headed by Dimitar Peshev, the deputy speaker of the National Assembly, met with Interior Minister Petur Gabrovski. Facing strong opposition from within the country, Gabrovski relented. The same day, he sent telegrams to the roundup centers in the pre-war territory of Bulgaria, postponing the deportations to a future, unidentified date. In a report of 5 April 1943, Adolph Hoffman, a German government adviser and police attache at the German legation in Sofia (1943–44) wrote: "The Minister of Interior has received instruction from the highest place to stop the planned deportation of Jews from the old borders of Bulgaria". In fact, Gabrovski's decision was not taken on his own "personal initiative", but had come from the highest authority – Tsar Boris III, who decided under pressure to temporarily stop the deportation of the rest of the Jews. While Jews living in Bulgaria proper were saved, almost all the Jews from Vardar Macedonia and Aegean Thrace perished in the death camps of Treblinka and Majdanek.

Still reluctant to comply with the German deportation request, the royal palace utilised Swiss diplomatic channels to inquire whether it was possible to deport the Jews to British-controlled Palestine by ship rather than to concentration camps in German-occupied Poland by boat and train. This was blocked by the British Foreign Secretary, Anthony Eden.

Aware of Bulgaria's unreliability on the Jewish matter, the Nazis grew more suspicious about the quiet activities in aid of European Jewry of an old friend of Tsar Boris, Monsignor Angelo Roncalli (the future Pope John XXIII), the Papal Nuncio in Istanbul. Reporting on the humanitarian efforts of Roncalli, his secretary in Venice and in the Vatican, Monsignor Loris F. Capovilla writes: "Through his intervention, and with the help of Tsar Boris III of Bulgaria, thousands of Jews from Slovakia, who had first been sent to Hungary and then to Bulgaria, and who were in danger of being sent to Nazi concentration camps, obtained transit visas for Palestine signed by him."

Meetings with Hitler

Nazi pressure on Tsar Boris III continued for the deportation of the Bulgarian Jewry. At the end of March, Hitler "invited" the Tsar to visit him. Upon returning home, Boris ordered able-bodied Jewish men to join hard labor units to build roads within the interior of his kingdom. Some claim that this was the Tsar's attempt to avoid deporting them.

During May 1943, Dannecker and Belev, the Commissar for Jewish Affairs, planned the deportation of more than 48,000 Bulgarian Jews, who were to be loaded on steamers on the River Danube. Boris continued the cat-and-mouse game that he had long been playing; he insisted to the Nazis that Bulgarian Jews were needed for the construction of roads and railway lines inside his kingdom. Nazi officials requested that Bulgaria deport its Jewish population to German-occupied Poland. The request caused a public outcry, and a campaign whose most prominent leaders were Parliament's deputy speaker Dimitar Peshev and the head of the Bulgarian Orthodox Church, Archbishop Stefan, was organised. Following this campaign, Boris refused to permit the extradition of Bulgaria's nearly 50,000 Jews.

On 30 June 1943, Apostolic Delegate Angelo Roncalli, the future Pope John XXIII, wrote to Boris, asking for mercy for "the sons of the Jewish people." He wrote that Tsar Boris should on no account agree to the dishonorable action that Hitler was demanding. On the copy of the letter, the future pope noted, by hand, that the Tsar replied verbally to his message. The note states "Il Re ha fatto qualche cosa" ("The Tsar did something"); and while noting the difficult situation of the monarch, Roncalli stressed once again "Però, ripeto, ha fatto" ("But I repeat, he has acted").

An excerpt from the diary of Rabbi Daniel Zion, the spiritual leader of the Jewish community in Bulgaria during the war years, reads:

Do not be afraid, dear brothers and sisters! Trust in the Holy Rock of our salvation ... Yesterday I was informed by Bishop Stephen about his conversation with the Bulgarian tsar. When I went to see Bishop Stephen, he said: "Tell your people, the Tsar has promised, that the Bulgarian Jews shall not leave the borders of Bulgaria ...". When I returned to the synagogue, silence reigned in anticipation of the outcome of my meeting with Bishop Stephen. When I entered, my words were: "Yes, my brethren, God heard our prayers ..."

Most irritating for Hitler was the Tsar's refusal to declare war on the Soviet Union or send Bulgarian troops to the Eastern Front. On 9 August 1943, Hitler summoned Boris to a stormy meeting at Rastenburg, East Prussia. Boris arrived by plane from Vrazhdebna on 14 August. The Tsar asserted his stance once again not to send Bulgarian Jews to death camps in occupied Poland or Germany. While Bulgaria had declared a "symbolic" war on the distant United Kingdom and United States, the Tsar was not willing to do more than that. At the meeting, Boris once again refused to get involved in the war against the Soviet Union, giving two major reasons for his unwillingness to send troops to Russia. First, many ordinary Bulgarians had strong pro-Russian sentiments; and second, the political and military position of Turkey remained unclear. The "symbolic" war against the Western Allies turned into a disaster for the citizens of Sofia, as the city was heavily bombarded by the US Army Air Force and the British Royal Air Force in 1943 and 1944. (The bombardment of Bulgarian cities was started by the British Royal Air Force in April 1941 without declaring a war.)

Bulgaria's opposition came to a head at this last official meeting between Hitler and Boris. Reports of the meeting indicate that Hitler was furious with the Tsar for refusing either to join the war against the USSR or to deport the Jews within his kingdom. At the end of the meeting, it was agreed that "the Bulgarian Jews were not to be deported, for Tsar Boris had insisted that the Jews were needed for various laboring tasks including road maintenance."

Death

Shortly after returning to Sofia from a meeting with Hitler, Boris died of apparent heart failure on 28 August 1943, at approximately 16:22. According to the diary of the German attache in Sofia at the time, Carl-August von Schoenebeck, the two German doctors who attended the King – Sajitz and Hans Eppinger – both believed that he had died from the same poison that Dr. Eppinger had allegedly found two years earlier in the postmortem examination of the Greek Prime Minister, Ioannis Metaxas, a slow poison which takes weeks to do its work and which causes the appearance of blotches on the skin of its victim before death.

Rumors of the death of Boris III indicate that the Tsar was poisoned by an order of Hitler, who was greatly irritated after his last meeting with the Bulgarian ruler because of his refusal to hand over the Bulgarian Jews and send troops against the USSR. According to the Prime Minister, Prof. Bogdan Filov, however, in their last meeting, Hitler and Boris III discussed only the sending of additional Bulgarian troops to the Western Balkans, but not against the USSR.

His son Simeon Saxe-Coburg-Gotha did not deny this version, but pointed out as probable the hypothesis that the USSR was also interested in the Tsar's death, in which case the NKVD intervened. Princess Marie Louise of Bulgaria stated in an interview that there was no definite version of what had happened, but that she was convinced that her father had not been poisoned by the Nazis or the British, but by the East. Meanwhile, the American news reports stated that Hitler tried to hit him and the Tsar suffered a heart attack at the meeting; the latter died three weeks later.

In his personal diary, Joseph Goebbels expressed doubts that the Italian government, in the person of Prime Minister Pietro Badoglio, was responsible for Boris III's death. According to Goebbels, Hitler was convinced that the Italian royal court was the organizer of the poisoning of Boris III, as Princess Mafalda of Savoy, sister of Joan of Bulgaria, was visiting Bulgaria four weeks before the monarch's death and her visit coincided with the events of 25 July 1943, the overthrow of the Italian Fascist dictator Benito Mussolini, supported by King Victor Emmanuel III.

Boris was succeeded by his six-year-old son Simeon II, under a Regency Council headed by Boris's brother Prince Kiril of Bulgaria.

Following a large, impressive state funeral at the Alexander Nevsky Cathedral, Sofia, where the streets were lined with weeping crowds, the coffin of Tsar Boris III was taken by train to the mountains and buried in Bulgaria's largest and most important monastery, the Rila Monastery. After taking power in September 1944, the Communist-dominated government had his body exhumed and secretly buried in the courtyard of Vrana Palace, near Sofia. At a later time, the Communist authorities moved the zinc coffin from Vrana to a secret location, which remains unknown to this day. After the fall of communism, an excavation was made at Vrana Palace. Only Boris's heart was found, as it had been put in a glass cylinder outside the coffin. The heart was taken by his widow in 1994 to Rila Monastery, where it was reinterred.

A wood carving is placed on the left side of his grave in Rila Monastery, made on 10 October 1943 by inhabitants of the village of Osoj, Debar district. The carving bears the following inscription:

Family 

In the year 1930, Boris married the Italian Princess Giovanna of Savoy, who became Queen of Bulgaria under the name Joanna. They had two children:
 Princess Marie Louise (1933– )
 Prince Simeon (1937– ), Tsar Simeon II (1943 to 1946)

Honours

National
  Bulgaria: Sovereign Knight Grand Cross with Collar of the Order of Saints Cyril and Methodius
  Bulgaria: Sovereign Knight Grand Cross with Collar of the Order of Saint Alexander
 : Sovereign Knight Grand Cross of the Order of Bravery
 : Sovereign Knight Grand Cross of the Order of Military Merit
 : Sovereign Knight Grand Cross of the Order of Civil Merit
 : Sovereign recipient of the Medal for the Independence of Bulgaria
 : Sovereign recipient of the Medal for Participation in the Balkan Wars of 1912–1913
 : Sovereign recipient of the Medal for Participation in the European War 1915–1918
 : Sovereign recipient of the Commemorative Medal of the death of Princess Marie Louise
 : Sovereign recipient of the 1000th Anniversary Medal of the birth of Tsar Boris I
 : Sovereign recipient of the Medal for the Coronation of Tsar Ferdinand I and Queen Eleonore
 : Sovereign recipient of the 50th Anniversary Medal of Liberation from the Ottoman Empire
 : Sovereign recipient of the 1000th Anniversary Medal of the death of Tsar Simeon I
 : Sovereign recipient of the Medal for the Wedding of Tsar Boris III And Princess Giovanna of Italy

Foreign
 : Knight Grand Cordon of the Order of Leopold
 : Grand Cross of the Legion of Honour
 Germany:
 : Order of the German Eagle (Grand Cross class in gold with star) 
  German Imperial and Royal Family:
 Knight of the Imperial and Royal Order of the Black Eagle
 Knight Grand Cross of the Imperial and Royal Order of the Red Eagle
 Pour le Mérite (military), 26 October 1916
  Bavarian Royal Family: Knight with Collar of the Royal Order of St. Hubert
    Ernestine Ducal Families: Knight Grand Cross of the Saxe-Ernestine House Order, 1908
 Hungary:
  Hungarian Royal Family: Knight Grand Cross of the Royal Hungarian Order of St. Stephen, 1912
  Regency Hungary: Knight Grand Cross with Holy Crown and Collar of the Order of Merit, 22 June 1939
  Italian Royal Family: Knight with Collar of the Supreme Order of the Most Holy Annunciation, 2 February 1911
  Parmese Ducal Family: Knight Grand Cross of the Sacred Military Constantinian Order of St. George
  Montenegrin Royal Family: Knight Grand Cross of the Order of Prince Danilo I, 1910
 : Knight of the Order of the White Eagle
  Romanian Royal Family: Knight Grand Cross with Collar of the Order of Carol I
 :
 Knight with Collar of the Imperial Order of St. Andrew, 1907
 Knight 1st Class of the Order of St. Anna
  Georgian Royal Family: Knight Grand Cross of the Royal Order of the Eagle of Georgia
 : Honorary Knight Grand Cross of the Royal Victorian Order
  Yugoslavian Royal Family: Knight Grand Cross of the Order of the Star of Karađorđe

Arms

Patronages

National patronages
 : Sovereign Patron of the 1st Infantry regiment of Prince Alexander I
 : Sovereign Patron of the 4th Infantry regiment of Prince Boris
 : Sovereign Patron of the 6th Infantry regiment of Tsar Ferdinand I
 : Sovereign Patron of the 8th Infantry regiment of Princess Marie Louise
 : Sovereign Patron of the 9th Infantry regiment of Princess Clementine
 : Sovereign Patron of the 18th Infantry regiment of Tsar Ferdinand I
 : Sovereign Patron of the 20th Infantry regiment of Prince Krill and of Princesses Eudoxia and Nadezhda
 : Sovereign Patron of the 24th Infantry regiment of Queen Eleonore
 : Sovereign Patron of the 19th Infantry regiment of Prince Simeon
 : Sovereign Patron of the 1st Cavalry regiment of Tsar Alexander I
 : Sovereign Patron of the 2nd Cavalry regiment of Princess Marie Louise
 : Sovereign Patron of the 10th Cavalry regiment of Queen Ionna
 : Sovereign Patron of the 3rd Cavalry regiment of Prince Simeon
 : Sovereign Patron of the 4th Artillery regiment of KTsar Ferdinand I
 : Sovereign Patron of the Life Guard regiment of The Tsar
 : Sovereign Patron of the Navy regiment of The Tsar
 : Sovereign Patron of the 1st Army Artillery regiment of Prince Simeon

Foreign patronages
 : Patron of the Balkan Infantry regiment of Emperor Wilhelm II
 : Patron of the 22nd Infantry regiment of Charles Edward I
 : Patron of the 17th Infantry regiment of Grand Duke Vladmir Alexandrovich
 : Patron of the Azov Infantry regiment

Tributes 
The Los Angeles Times reported in 1994 that the Jewish National Fund's Medal of the Legion of Honor was being awarded posthumously to Tsar Boris III, "the first non-Jew to receive one of the Jewish community's highest honors".

In 1996, Bulgarian Jews in the United States and the Jewish National Fund erected a monument in "The Bulgarian Forest" in Israel to honor Tsar Boris as a savior of Bulgarian Jews. In July 2003, a public committee headed by Israeli Chief Justice Dr. Moshe Beiski decided to remove the memorial because Bulgaria had consented to the delivery of 11,343 Jews from occupied territory of Macedonia, Thrace and Pirot to the Germans.

Borisova gradina, the largest park in Sofia and one of the city's biggest boulevards are named after him.

Ancestors

See also
History of Bulgaria
European interwar dictatorships
List of covers of Time magazine (1940s)

Notes

References

Bibliography
 Bulgaria in the Second World War by Marshall Lee Miller, Stanford University Press, 1975.
 Boris III of Bulgaria 1894–1943, by Pashanko Dimitroff, London, 1986, 
 Crown of Thorns by Stephane Groueff, Lanham MD., and London, 1987, 
 The Betrayal of Bulgaria by Gregory Lauder-Frost, Monarchist League Policy Paper, London, 1989.
 The Daily Telegraph, Obituary for "HM Queen Ioanna of the Bulgarians", London, 28 February 2000.
 Balkans into Southeastern Europe by John R. Lampe, Palgrave Macmillan, New York, 2006.
 A History of Israel: From the Rise of Zionism to Our Time by Howard M. Sachar, Alfred A. Knopf, New York, 2007,

External links

Tsar Boris III Honored by the United States Congress. TsarBoris III, Savior of Bulgarian Jewry
Tsar Boris III, concealed savior of the Bulgarian Jews
The Case of Tsar Boris III, Unsung Hero of the Holocaust

Tsar Boris III, Savior of the Bulgarian Jews
Historical photographs of the royal palace in Sofia
 
 Empty Boxcars Vimeo
 Wayback Machine Saving Bulgaria's Jews: An analysis of social identity and the mobilisation of social solidarity
 "Guide to Jewish Bulgaria" by Dimana Trankova & Anthony Georgieff, Sofia, 2011;
 

1894 births
1943 deaths
20th-century Bulgarian monarchs
Converts to Eastern Orthodoxy from Roman Catholicism
Eastern Orthodox Christians from Bulgaria
Members of the Bulgarian Orthodox Church
House of Saxe-Coburg and Gotha (Bulgaria)
Nobility from Sofia
World War II political leaders
Burials at the Rila Monastery
Eastern Orthodox monarchs
The Holocaust in Bulgaria
Recipients of the Order of Bravery, 1st class
Grand Master of the Order of Military Merit (Bulgaria)
Grand Crosses of the Order of Military Merit (Bulgaria)